Shehyni is a land border crossing between Ukraine and Poland on the Ukrainian side, near the village of Shehyni, Yavoriv Raion, Lviv Oblast.

The crossing is situated on autoroute . Across the border on the Polish side is the village of Medyka, Jaroslaw County, Podkarpackie Voivodeship.

The type of crossing is automobile, status - international. The types of transportation for automobile crossings are passenger and freight.

The port of entry is part of the Mostyska customs post of Lviv customs.

See also
 Poland–Ukraine border
 State Border of Ukraine
 Highway M11 (Ukraine)

References

External links
 State Border Guard of Ukraine website 
 Пункти пропуску на кордоні із Росією — Державна прикордонна служба (English: Checkpoints on the Border with Russia) from The State Border Service website 

Geography of Lviv Oblast
Poland–Ukraine border crossings